Nationality words link to articles with information on the nation's poetry or literature (for instance, Irish or France).

Events
 In Denmark, Anders Bording ceases publication of Den Danske Meercurius ("The Danish Mercury"), a monthly newspaper in rhyme, using alexandrine verse, single-handedly published by the author; founded in 1666

Works published
 John Cleveland, Clievelandi Vindiciae; or, Clieveland's Genuine Poems, Orations, Epistles, poetry and prose (see also J. Cleaveland Revived 1659)
 John Dryden, Apology for Heroic Poetry and Poetic License
 Urian Oakes, An Elegie Upon the Death of the Reverend Mr. Thomas Shepard, English Colonial America
 John Oldham, Upon the Marriage of the Prince of Orange with the Lady Mary, published anonymously, on the marriage of the future William III and Mary II in November of this year
 Nahum Tate, Poems (published in an expanded edition in 1684 as Poems Written on Several Occasions)

Births
Death years link to the corresponding "[year] in poetry" article:
 Undated – Elizabeth, Lady Wardlaw (born 1727), English ballad writer

Deaths
Birth years link to the corresponding "[year] in poetry" article:
 May 24 – Anders Bording (born 1619), Danish poet and journalist
 July 9 – Johannes Scheffler, also known as "Angelus Silesius" (born 1624), German mystic and poet
 October 29 – Charles Coypeau d'Assoucy (born 1604), French musician and burlesque poet
 December 24 – Jacques de Coras (born 1625), French poet and minister
 Undated – Saib Tabrizi (born 1601), Persian master of the form of classical Arabic and Persian lyric poetry known as ghazel

See also

 Poetry
 17th century in poetry
 17th century in literature
 Restoration literature

Notes

17th-century poetry
Poetry